Daniel Bomberg ( – ) was one of the most important early printers of Hebrew books. A Christian hebraist who employed rabbis, scholars and apostates in his Venice publishing house, Bomberg printed the first Mikraot Gdolot (Rabbinic Bible) and the first complete Babylonian and Jerusalem Talmuds, based on the layout pioneered by the Soncino family printers, with the commentaries of Rashi, and of the Tosfot in the margins. These editions set standards that are still in use today, in particular the pagination of the Babylonian Talmud. His publishing house printed about 200 Hebrew books, including Siddurim, responsa, codes of law, works of philosophy and ethics, commentaries, and more. He was the first Hebrew printer in Venice and the first non-Jewish printer of Hebrew books.

Biography 
Bomberg was born around 1483 in Antwerp, Brabant to Cornelius van Bombergen and Agnes Vranckx. Van Bombergen  was a merchant  who sent his son to Venice to help with the family business. There Daniel met Felix Pratensis (Felice da Prato), an Augustinian friar who had converted from Judaism, and who is said to be the one who encouraged Bomberg to print Hebrew books. Bomberg established an initially successful printing press in Venice, in which he supposedly invested over 4,000,000 ducats. Other sources, likely equally exaggerated, claim that he lost at least as much. He returned to Antwerp in 1539, though his press continued to operate until 1548, and it seems he retained some level of involvement throughout. Very little is known about his death some time between 1549 and 1553.

Publication of the Pentateuch and Mikraot Gdolot (1517-19) 
Bomberg began his printing career in 1517 with the first edition of Mikraot Gdolot (Rabbinic Bible). The four volume set included the Hebrew Pentateuch with accompanying commentaries (many of which had never previously been printed), a Targum (Aramaic translation), the haftarot and the Five Megillot. It was printed with the approval of Pope Leo X and the editing was overseen by the Jewish convert to Christianity Felix Pratensis.

Criticism 
The first edition generated harsh criticism by Jewish audiences, possibly because of its numerous errors, albeit mostly minor issues in the cantillation and pronunciation marks, and possibly because of the involvement of the apostate Pratensis. In a second edition edited by Yaakov b. Hayim Adonijah hundreds of such errors were fixed, and though it still generated criticism, it nonetheless served as the standard upon which future printings of Mikraot Gdolot were based.

Innovations in use of Chapter and Verse Numbers 
Bomberg was the first to print chapter and verse numbers in a Hebrew bible. Today this innovation has become so commonplace it is hard to believe how remarkable it was at the time. The division of the Vulgate into chapters was made in the 13th century, and Jews began adopting the numbers for use in concordances by the mid fourteen hundreds, yet until Bomberg, no Hebrew bible had ever included the chapter numbers as part of the book itself. Bomberg not only added the chapter numbers; he was the first to indicate verse numbers on the printed page. Though verse numbers were used by convention for centuries, no one had thought to include these numbers on the printed page of the bible. This seemingly trivial innovation immediately caught on and can be seen in many bibles of his era, and is still in use today.

Censorship 
Though Bomberg opposed censorship in principle, he had a keen sense of the dangers of printing texts seen as threatening to Christianity. Thus, for example, the commentary of Rabbi David Kimchi (Radak) was significantly censored because it contained anti-Christian polemics. These were published later in a separate book, which Bomberg released in a limited edition.

Publication of the Babylonian Talmud (1519-23) 
Probably Bomberg's most impressive accomplishment is his publication of the editio princeps (first printed edition) of the complete Babylonian Talmud, which he completed in under four years. Bomberg adopted the format created by Joshua Solomon Soncino, who printed the first individual tractates of the Talmud in 1483, with the Talmud text in the middle of the page and the commentaries of Rashi and Tosfot surrounding it. Published with the approval of Pope Leo X, this edition became the standard format, which all later editions have followed. The project was overseen by chief editor Rabbi Chiya Meir b. David, a rosh yeshiva and dayan (judge) on the Venice rabbinical court. In addition to the Rashi and the Tosfot on the page, Bomberg included other commentaries at the back, such as Rabbeinu Asher (Rosh), Maimonides’ commentary on the Mishna and Piskei Tosfot.

Standardization 
The Bomberg edition of the Talmud established the standard both in terms of page layout as well as pagination (with the exception of the tractate Berachot which follows Bomberg's second edition). Prior to the printing of the Talmud, manuscripts had no standard page division, and the Talmud text usually did not appear on the same page as the commentaries, which were contained in separate codices. The standard page layout in use in all conventional editions of Talmud today (also the accepted method of citing a Talmudic reference) follows the pagination of Bomberg's 1523 publication.

Originality 
The earliest printed Talmuds were published by the Soncino family decades prior to Bomberg's Talmud. Though the Soncinos only printed about sixteen tractates, Bomberg clearly based his own publication after their model. Gershon Soncino claimed that in addition to emulating his layout, Bomberg also copied the texts of the Soncino Talmuds, a claim some modern scholars, such as Raphael Rabinovicz, have substantiated. Still, Bomberg printed many tractates that Soncino never released, which were obviously rendered directly from manuscripts, and even the editions which may have borrowed from Soncino's text show evidence of having been supplemented by additional manuscripts.

Staff 
Bomberg employed some of Venice's leading scholars and Rabbis in his publishing house. Besides Rabbi Chiya Meir b. David, rosh yeshiva and dayan in Venice, there were notable figures such as Rabbi Avraham de Balmes, Rabbi Chaim b. Rabbi Moshe Alton, and the Maharam Padua. Bomberg's Talmud edition is generally considered highly accurate, and many bibliographers and historians have praised the precision of the text.

Publishing Rights 
In 1518, Bomberg requested and received from the Venetian Senate the exclusive printing rights to the Talmud, and received official endorsement from Pope Leo X. Nonetheless, Venetian politicians were suspicious of Hebrew printing. In 1525, when Bomberg attempted to renew his license for a fee of 100 ducats, the Venetian senate refused, accusing Bomberg's Hebrew publications of attacking the Catholic faith. Several months later, for a fee of 500 ducats, they approved his appeal and renewed his license.

Censorship and Papal Approval 
Unlike the previously printed editions of the Talmud, Bomberg's work was largely uncensored. In the early stages of his career he cultivated a positive relationship with the Vatican, and he received approval from Pope Leo X for both the publication of Mikraot Gdolot as well as the Talmud. In later years Hebrew printing was viewed with mounting suspicion. By the end of his career, in the late 1540s, fears of censorship and church opposition caused Bomberg to release editions of the Talmud with backdated cover pages.

In 1548 Pope Paul III dispatched his ambassador to censure the venetian Hebrew publications, but Bomberg argued that ancient manuscripts were not to be altered, and successfully resisted papal pressure. Though the church did not successfully interfere with Bomberg's printing within his lifetime, by 1553 the Talmud was being burned in Italy and the church was actively seeking to restrict its publication and circulation.

Other publications 
In addition to the Mikraot Gdolot and the Babylonian Talmud, Bomberg's printing house published some two hundred other Hebrew books, many for the first time. Some of the more notable works published include:
 The Jerusalem Talmud (without commentaries)
 The Mishna
 Six editions of Midrashim
 A four-volume Karaite prayer book
 The Tosefta
 Responsa of Israel Isserlein (Terumat HaDeshen)
 Responsa of Joseph Colon Trabotto (Maharik)
 Responsa of Shlomo b. Aderet (Rashba)
 Responsa of Alfasi (Rif)
 The Yad HaChazakah (Maimonides' Mishneh Torah)
 Code of Moses b. Jacob of Coucy (Sefer Mitzvot Gdolot)
 Code of Jacob b. Asher (Turim)
In addition to these works, Bomberg's publishing house released dozens of prayer books and commentaries on prayer, grammars, dictionaries and concordances and many more rabbinic, philosophic and ethical works.

Legacy 
Bomberg's printing became such a standard of quality that subsequent books are found advertising themselves to be printed “with Bomberg type."

The title page of a book of Psalms from 1765 - centuries after Bomberg's death – gives testament to the lasting gratitude Jewish communities felt toward him. The dedication reads: “Daniel Bomberg, whose name is known in the gates of justice […] was great among the Christians, producing gold from his purse in order to print from his printing press…”

In his book “Venetian Printers of Hebrew Books,” Joshua Bloch wrote:

“[A]s a pioneer in Hebrew printing in Venice [Bomberg] established so high a standard that no one has surpassed his work, even with the aid of modern mechanical improvements, and it is a question whether Hebrew printing has yet equaled the quality and taste shown in the productions of the Bomberg press.”

On December 22, 2015, a well-preserved complete copy of the first edition of Bomberg's Babylonian Talmud, formerly contained in the Valmadonna Trust Library, sold at a Sotheby's auction for $9.3 million to Leon Black, a New York businessman who founded Apollo Global Management, a private equity firm.

References

External links 

 Library of Congress page with page of Bomberg Bible
 

1549 deaths
People of the Habsburg Netherlands
Businesspeople from Antwerp
Republic of Venice printers
Year of birth unknown
Belgian printers
Year of birth uncertain